The Birch Creek Charcoal Kilns are a group of beehive-shaped clay charcoal kilns near Leadore, Idaho, built in 1886. They were listed on the National Register of Historic Places in 1972.

The kilns were built in 1886 to produce charcoal to fuel the smelter at Nicholia, which smelted lead and silver ore from the Viola Mine located about 10 miles east of the kilns. The Viola ore deposit was discovered in 1881 and was mined until 1888, when the ore was depleted and the price of lead had fallen.

A Butte, Montana, man named Warren King built 16 kilns from brick made from local clay, possibly obtained from Jump Creek on the east side of the Birch Creek valley. When operating, each kiln used 30 to 40 cords of Douglas fir wood per load, producing about 1,500 to 2,000 bushels (70 cubic meters) of charcoal over a two-day burn. The kiln operation lasted for less than three years, employing 150 to 200 people at its peak, and had a monthly output estimated at 44,000 to 50,000 bushels (1550 to 1762 cubic meters) of charcoal.

The ruins of four kilns survive. They are located on the Caribou-Targhee National Forest, which operates the location as a public interpretive site. Nicholia is now a ghost town, with only a few ruins remaining. There are no surviving remains of the town of Woodland, a short distance south of the kilns, where the kiln workers lived. The kilns were listed on the National Register of Historic Places in 1972. In 1987, a volunteer-assisted stabilization effort prevented one of the kilns from collapsing. The Forest Service undertook a restoration of the kilns in 2000.

References

External links

Buildings and structures in Lemhi County, Idaho
Historic American Engineering Record in Idaho
Kilns
Charcoal ovens
Tourist attractions in Lemhi County, Idaho
Industrial buildings and structures on the National Register of Historic Places in Idaho
Charcoal
National Register of Historic Places in Lemhi County, Idaho